Frederick Langdon Hubbard (1878–1953) was Chairman of the Toronto Transportation Commission from 1929 to 1930. He was the first African Canadian to serve on the TTC board (first as Commissioner and later as Chairman). Born in Toronto in 1878, Hubbard was son of a high profile African Canadian and Toronto politician William Peyton Hubbard and son-in-law to the first African Canadian licensed to practice medicine in Ontario Anderson Ruffin Abbott (married to daughter  Grace Isabell Abbott). Hubbard died in 1953. 

Hubbard worked for the Toronto Street Railway from 1906 to 1921, and served as the chair of the TTC from 1929 to 1930, vice-chair in 1931 and a commissioner from 1932 to 1939.

A historical plaque was installed in 2014 at his former residence of 662 Broadview Avenue.

Ancestry and unretouched photo

of Frederick Langdon Hubbard

Legacy
Hubbard Boulevard in the Beach area of Toronto is named from him.

References

Black Canadian politicians
1878 births
1953 deaths
Chairs of the Toronto Transit Commission